Cymoninus is a genus of true bugs in the family Ninidae. There are at least four described species in Cymoninus.

Species
These four species belong to the genus Cymoninus:
 Cymoninus notabilis (Distant, 1893)
 Cymoninus sechellensis (Bergroth, 1893)
 Cymoninus turaensis (Paiva, 1919)
 Cymoninus wilcoxae Brailovsky, 1975

References

Lygaeoidea
Articles created by Qbugbot